El Periòdic d'Andorra is a newspaper of the Principality of Andorra. It has its headquarters in Escaldes-Engordany.

External links
Official website

Newspapers published in Andorra
Publications with year of establishment missing
Catalan-language newspapers